John Holmes (by 1529 – 4 June 1583), of London, North Mimms, Hertfordshire and Owston and Hampole, Yorkshire, was an English politician.

He was a Member (MP) of the Parliament of England for Boroughbridge in November 1554 and for Ripon in 1555.

References

1583 deaths
Politicians from London
People from Welwyn Hatfield (district)
People from the Metropolitan Borough of Doncaster
Year of birth uncertain
English MPs 1554–1555
English MPs 1555